Nazrul Islam Politician of Chittagong District of Bangladesh and member of Parliament for Chittagong-11 and Chittagong-7.

Career
Islam was elected to parliament from Chittagong-11 as a Bangladesh Nationalist Party candidate in 1979.  He was elected to parliament from Chittagong-7 as a Jatiya Party candidate in 1988.

References

Jatiya Party politicians
Living people
2nd Jatiya Sangsad members
People from Chittagong District
Year of birth missing (living people)
4th Jatiya Sangsad members